Flora Lamson Hewlett (August 14, 1914 – February 9, 1977) was an American billionaire philanthropist.

Early life and education
Flora Lamson was born in 1914 and raised in Berkeley, California, and she summered in the Sierra Nevada. It was then that she met and became friends with Louise Hewlett, her future husband's sister, as both families had cabins in the Sierra. She received a Bachelor of Science in Biochemistry from the University of California, Berkeley in 1935. After graduation, she joined the Sierra Club and reconnected with her friend Louise, who reintroduced her to her husband, Bill Hewlett, the co-founder of Hewlett-Packard.

Philanthropy
In 1966, she co-founded the William and Flora Hewlett Foundation with her husband. She sat on the Board of Trustees of Stanford University in Palo Alto, California, and the San Francisco Theological Seminary, a Presbyterian in San Anselmo, California. She also served on the Executive Committee of the World Affairs Council of Northern California and on the Board of Directors of California Tomorrow, an environmental non-profit organization.

The Flora Lamson Hewlett Library, a collection of theological books serving the Graduate Theological Union in Berkeley, California, is named in her honor. The Flora Family Foundation, created by her children, is also named in her honor. Its symbol is the blue gentiana, her favorite flower.

Personal life
In 1939, she married Bill Hewlett, the co-founder of Hewlett-Packard. They had five children and twelve grandchildren. She was an elder of the First Presbyterian Church in Palo Alto. She died of cancer on February 9, 1977.

References

1914 births
1977 deaths
People from Berkeley, California
University of California, Berkeley alumni
Stanford University people
American Presbyterians
Deaths from cancer in California
20th-century American philanthropists
Hewlett Foundation